Ivenack is a municipality in the Mecklenburgische Seenplatte district, in Mecklenburg-Vorpommern, Germany. It is famous for its baroque ensemble (featuring a castle, church, orangery, outbuildings) and its natural heritage (oak trees that are older than thousand years).

References

External links

 Official website of Ivenack at www.gemeinde-ivenack.de(German)
 1000-year-old Ivenack oaks (German)

Grand Duchy of Mecklenburg-Schwerin
Municipalities in Mecklenburg-Western Pomerania
Mecklenburgische Seenplatte (district)